John Stead (born 11 March 1956) is an Australian-English Anglican bishop who served as the Bishop of Willochra from 30 June 2012 to 2 July 2022.

Career
English born, he grew up in Canberra, attending Deakin High School. He received a Bachelor of Education from the University of Canberra in 1979 and worked as a school teacher. In 1996 he was awarded a Bachelor's degree in Theology from the Sydney College of Divinity and was made a deacon in 1995 and a priest the following year. He was awarded a Master of Ministry from the School of Theology at Charles Sturt University in 2022 with a focus on Pastoral (Professional) Supervision.

Stead served as a priest in the Diocese of Canberra and Goulburn and was collated as an Archdeacon and installed as Rector of the Parish of St John's Wagga Wagga in 2004. In 2009 he was consecrated Assistant bishop of the Diocese of Bathurst and was based in Dubbo, and in 2012 was enthroned as Bishop of Willochra. He retired as Bishop on 2 July 2022.

Personal life
Stead is married to Jan and they have two adult sons.

References

1964 births
21st-century Anglican bishops in Australia
Anglican bishops of Willochra
English emigrants to Australia
Living people
Assistant bishops in the Anglican Diocese of Bathurst